The 1997–98 League of Ireland Premier Division was the 13th season of the League of Ireland Premier Division. The division was made up of 12 teams. St Patrick's Athletic F.C. won the title.

Regular season
The season saw each team playing three rounds of games, playing every other team three times, totalling 33 games.

Final Table

Results

Matches 1–22

Matches 23–33

Promotion/relegation play-off
University College Dublin A.F.C. who finished in tenth place played off against Limerick F.C., the third placed team from the 1997–98 League of Ireland First Division.

1st Leg

2nd Leg 

UCD won 5–2 on aggregate and retained their place in the Premier Division.

See also
 1997–98 League of Ireland First Division

References

Ireland
1997–98 in Republic of Ireland association football
League of Ireland Premier Division seasons